The Blue Front Rooming House, at 1187 Main St. in Forsyth, Montana, was built in 1912.  It was listed on the National Register of Historic Places in 1990.

It has also been known as the Swanland Hotel.   It was deemed "significant as an excellent surviving example of an early twentieth-century residential lodging facility."

It is a two-story brick  commercial building.  Its facade is faced with light-colored commercial brick;  the sides are red brick, probably locally produced.

References

Hotel buildings on the National Register of Historic Places in Montana
National Register of Historic Places in Rosebud County, Montana
Italianate architecture in Montana
Residential buildings completed in 1912
Boarding houses
1912 establishments in Montana